William Hillier Holborow  (23 December 1841 – 10 July 1917) was an Australian politician.

Early life
He was born in Sydney to linen draper Daniel Holborow and his wife Mary. He was educated privately and became a storekeeper at Richmond. On 27 July 1864 he married Amelia Town; they had ten children. He formed the Richmond Volunteer Rifles as a lieutenant in 1870, becoming a captain in 1871, a lieutenant colonel in 1881 and a colonel in 1896.

Political career
An inaugural Richmond alderman from 1872, he was mayor from 1874, to 1875. He was again elected mayor in 1878, 1879, and 1880. 

In 1880 he was elected to the New South Wales Legislative Assembly as the member for Argyle. A Free Trader, he held his seat until his retirement in 1894. He was one of the commissioners for New South Wales for the  Melbourne Centennial Exhibition in 1888. In 1899 he was appointed to the Legislative Council, where he remained until his death. He did not hold ministerial or parliamentary office.

Death

Honours
He was appointed a Companion of the Order of St Michael and St George (CMG) in 1896, and awarded a Volunteer Officers' Decoration in 1895.

References

 

1841 births
1917 deaths
Members of the New South Wales Legislative Assembly
Members of the New South Wales Legislative Council
Free Trade Party politicians
Australian Companions of the Order of St Michael and St George